The  Washington Redskins season was the franchise's 42nd season in the National Football League (NFL) and their 37th  in Washington, D.C. The team failed to improve on their 11–3 record from 1972, and finished 10-4.

Roster

Pre season

Schedule

Pre Season Game Officials

Pre season Game summaries

Week P1 (Friday, August 3, 1973): vs. Detroit Lions

 Time of Game:

Week P2 (Friday, August 10, 1973): vs. Denver Broncos

 Time of Game: 2 hours, 43 minutes

Week P3 (Friday, August 17, 1973): at Buffalo Bills

 Time of Game:

Week P4 (Saturday, August 25, 1973): vs. Baltimore Colts

 Time of Game:

Week P5 (Sunday, September 2, 1973): at New England Patriots

 Time of Game: 2 hours, 41 minutes

Week P6 (Sunday, September 9, 1973): vs. Chicago Bears

 Time of Game:

Regular season

Schedule

Regular Season Game Officials

Standings

Regular Season Game summaries

Week 1 (Sunday, September 16, 1973): vs. San Diego Chargers

 Time of Game:

Week 2 (Sunday, September 23, 1973): at St. Louis Cardinals

 Time of Game:

Week 3 (Sunday, September 30, 1973): at Philadelphia Eagles

 Time of Game:

Week 4 (Monday, October 8, 1973): vs. Dallas Cowboys

 Time of Game:

Week 5 (Sunday, October 14, 1973): at New York Giants

 Time of Game:

Week 6 (Sunday, October 21, 1973): vs. St. Louis Cardinals

 Time of Game:

Week 7 (Sunday, October 28, 1973): at New Orleans Saints

 Time of Game:

Week 8 (Monday, November 5, 1973): at Pittsburgh Steelers

 Time of Game:

Week 9 (Sunday, November 11, 1973): vs. San Francisco 49ers

 Time of Game:

Week 10 (Sunday, November 18, 1973): vs. Baltimore Colts

 Time of Game:

Week 11 (Thursday, November 22, 1973): at Detroit Lions

 Time of Game:

Week 12 (Sunday, December 2, 1973): vs. New York Giants

 Time of Game:

Week 13 (Sunday, December 9, 1973): at Dallas Cowboys

 Time of Game:

Week 14 (Sunday, December 16, 1973): vs. Philadelphia Eagles

 Time of Game:

Stats

Passing

Rushing

Receiving

Kicking

Punting

Kick Return

Punt Return

Sacks

Interceptions

Fumbles

Tackles

Scoring Summary

Team

Quarter-by-quarter

Playoffs

Playoff Game Officials

NFC Divisional Playoffs (Saturday, December 22, 1973): at Minnesota Vikings

Point spread: Redskins +8
 Time of Game:

References

Washington
Washington Redskins seasons
Washing